12th parallel may refer to:

12th parallel north, a circle of latitude in the Northern Hemisphere
12th parallel south, a circle of latitude in the Southern Hemisphere

See also 

 Circle of latitude